Benedict Vilakazi may refer to:

 Benedict Wallet Vilakazi (1906–1947), South African Zulu poet, novelist, and educator
 Benedict Vilakazi (footballer) (born 1982), South African association football player